The 15th Pan American Games were held in Rio de Janeiro, Brazil from 13 July to 29 July 2007.

Results by event

Athletics
Men's 800 metres
Fadrique Iglesias
Semifinal 3 — 1:48.27 (→ did not advance)

Men's 5,000 metres
Eduardo Aruquipa
Final — 14:50.34 (→ 10th place)
Jorge César Fernández
Final — 15:36.57 (→ 12th place)

Women's 400m Hurdles
Daisy Ugarte
Semifinal 1 — 1:00.26 (→ did not advance)

Women's 20 km walk
Geovana Irusta
Final — DSQ (→ no ranking)

Football

Men's tournament
Preliminary Round

Semi Finals

Bronze-medal match

Triathlon

Men's Competition
Luis Torrico
 did not finish — no ranking

Women's Competition
Agnes Eppers
 did not finish — no ranking

See also
 Bolivia at the 2008 Summer Olympics

External links
Rio 2007 Official website

Nations at the 2007 Pan American Games
P
2007